Porganak (also Romanized as Porgānaḵ; also known as Parchūnag, Porgūnak, and Porjānak) is a village in Dehrud Rural District, Eram District, Dashtestan County, Bushehr Province, Iran. At the 2006 census, its population was 670, in 140 families.

References 

Populated places in Dashtestan County